Ceratostrotia is a monotypic moth genus of the family Noctuidae described by Warren in 1913. Its only species, Ceratostrotia melanchlaena, was first described by Swinhoe in 1891. It is found in India.

Subspecies
 Ceratostrotia melanchlaena rubidata Warren, 1913

References

Acontiinae
Moths described in 1891
Monotypic moth genera